Provincial elections were held in the Pakistani province of Sindh to elect the members of the 11th Provincial Assembly of Sindh on 18 February 2008, alongside nationwide general elections and three other provincial elections in North-West Frontier Province, Balochistan and Punjab. The remaining two territories of Pakistan, AJK and Gilgit-Baltistan, were ineligible to vote due to their disputed status.

Result

References

Elections in Sindh
2008 elections in Pakistan
2008 in Pakistani politics